Edmund Byrne may refer to:
 Edmund Widdrington Byrne, British judge and politician
 Edmund Byrne (bishop), Roman Catholic archbishop of Dublin